Aouzou (alternatively Aozou) is a small town and oasis in the extreme north of Chad, situated within the Aouzou Strip. It was the site of the Battle of Aouzou, during which Chadian forces captured the town from Libya in August 1987, followed by its recapture by Libya less than a month later. The town was formally transferred to Chadian control in 1994, along with the entirety of the Aouzou Strip.

In the early 1980s, the total population of the Aouzou area and the nearby valley of the Enneri Yebige was estimated to number around 1,300 persons.

References

1987 in Chad
Battles of the Chadian–Libyan conflict
Conflicts in 1987
Military history of Chad
Military history of Libya
Oases of Chad
Populated places in Chad
Tibesti Mountains
Tibesti Region